The Cayey Bridge, also known as Puente de Cayey, is an iron lateral lattice girder bridge in Puerto Rico that was built in 1891. It brings Puerto Rico Highway 15 over the Guamaní River.

It is an extremely rare example of such a bridge in the United States or its territories. Puerto Rico has the only bridges in the United States or its territories built with this technology.

The bridge was fabricated by the Belgian firm Nicrisse & Decluve.  The girder bridge has two independent spans.

It was listed on the National Register of Historic Places in 1995.

Gallery

See also
 Arenas Bridge, another Nicaise et Delcuve bridge in Puerto Rico.

References

External links

Road bridges on the National Register of Historic Places in Puerto Rico
Bridges completed in 1891
National Register of Historic Places in Guayama, Puerto Rico
1891 establishments in Puerto Rico
Girder bridges
Iron bridges